Danzig is the German name (and former official appellation) of Gdańsk, a city in northern Poland. 

Danzig may also refer to:

Places
 Danzig (region), government region, within the Prussian Provinces 1829-1878
 Free City of Danzig, a semi-autonomous city state that existed between 1920 and 1939
 Free City of Danzig (Napoleonic), a semi-independent city state established by Napoleon in 1807
 Danzig, North Dakota, a community in the United States
 Danzig-Holm, German Nazi Stutthof concentration camp
 Reichsgau Danzig-West Prussia, administrative division of Nazi Germany created on 8 October 1939 from annexed territory of the Free City of Danzig
 Köseler village, also known as Danzig, in Tunceli Province, Turkey
 Dereboyu village, also known as Danzig, in Tunceli Province, Turkey

Sport
 BuEV Danzig, Ballspiel- und Eislauf-Verein Danzig
 Gedania Danzig
 Gedania 1922 Gdańsk
 Ostmark Danzig
 Preußen Danzig
 LSV Danzig, Lufttwaffensportverein Danzig
 Post SG Danzig, Post Sportgemeinde Danzig
 SG OrPo Danzig, Sportverein Schutzpolizei Danzig

Other uses
 Danzig (band), an American heavy metal band
 Danzig (album), a 1988 album by the band
 Glenn Danzig, the band's lead singer and namesake
 Danzig law
 Danzig German, Northeastern German dialects
 Danzig (ship), three German naval ships
 Danzig (horse), an American racehorse
 Danzig Highflyer, a breed of fancy pigeon
 Danzig (surname)
 1419 Danzig, an asteroid
 Danzig Trilogy, a series of novels by Günter Grass

See also 
 Dantzig, a surname (including a list of people with the name)
 "Danzing", original title of Ukraine's 2007 Eurovision Song Contest entry
 Gdańsk (disambiguation)